The 2019 Sparkassen ATP Challenger was a professional tennis tournament played on indoor hard courts in Ortisei, Italy between 11 and 17 November 2019. It was the tenth edition of the tournament which was part of the 2019 ATP Challenger Tour.

Singles main-draw entrants

Seeds

 1 Rankings are as of 4 November 2019.

Other entrants
The following players received wildcards into the singles main draw:
  Filippo Baldi
  Enrico Dalla Valle
  Lorenzo Musetti
  Patric Prinoth
  Erwin Tröbinger

The following player received entry into the singles main draw using a protected ranking:
  Maximilian Neuchrist

The following player received entry into the singles main draw as an alternate:
  Julian Ocleppo

The following players received entry from the qualifying draw:
  Francesco Forti
  Aldin Šetkić

Champions

Singles

 Jannik Sinner def.  Sebastian Ofner 6–2, 6–4.

Doubles

 Nikola Ćaćić /  Antonio Šančić def.  Sander Arends /  David Pel 6–7(5–7), 7–6(7–3), [10–7].

References

2019 ATP Challenger Tour
2019
2019 in Italian tennis
November 2019 sports events in Italy